The Persistence of Memory is the name of a painting by Salvador Dalí.

The Persistence of Memory may also refer to:
 The Persistence of Memory (novel), a novel by Tony Eprile
 The Persistence of Memory (short story), a short story by Gael Baudino
 The Persistence of Memory (Cosmos: A Personal Voyage), an episode of Cosmos: A Personal Voyage
 The Persistence of Memory (album), a 2021 album by Emigrate

Persistence of Memory may refer to:
 Persistence of Memory, a novel by Amelia Atwater-Rhodes
 Persistent memory, computer memory that stores data which outlives the process that created it
 Persistence (computer science), a state in which memory outlives the process that created it